Djougou Airport  is a public use airport located near Djougou, Donga, Benin.

References

External links 
 Airport record for Djougou Airport at Landings.com

Airports in Benin
Donga Department